Jeremy Latimore (born 8 December 1986) is an Australian former professional rugby league footballer who played as a . 

He played for the Parramatta Eels, New Zealand Warriors, St. George-Illawarra Dragons in two separate spells, and the Penrith Panthers and the Cronulla-Sutherland Sharks in the NRL. Latimore also played for the Prime Minister's XIII in 2015.

Background
Latimore was born in Port Macquarie, New South Wales, Australia.

He played his junior football for the Port Macquarie Sharks before being signed by the Jeffery -Sutherland Sharks.

Playing career
He played for Cronulla's Premier League team in 2006, before being signed by the Parramatta Eels. In round 11 of the 2009 NRL season, he made his NRL debut for the Parramatta side against the South Sydney Rabbitohs. After playing seven games for Parramatta that year, he signed with the New Zealand Warriors.

Latimore played in 24 games for the Warriors in 2010 and 2011, scoring two tries before signing a one-year contract with the St. George Illawarra Dragons for 2012.

Latimore joined St. George Illawarra in the off-season and started the year off as a starting player in the Saints line-up for round 1 against the Newcastle Knights.

On 2 August 2012, Latimore signed a two-year contract with the Penrith Panthers starting in 2013.  Latimore played for Penrith in the club's 2014 preliminary final defeat against Canterbury-Bankstown at ANZ Stadium.

On 15 May 2015, it was announced that Latimore would be extending his stay with the Penrith outfit for a further two seasons until the end of 2017. On 26 September 2015, he played for the Prime Minister's XIII against Papua New Guinea.

He signed with the Cronulla-Sutherland Sharks for the 2017 season.

On 20 September, Latimore re-joined St. George on a one-year deal in 2018.
Latimore played in both finals games for St. George in the 2018 NRL season which were against Brisbane in the elimination final where St. George won 48–18 at Suncorp Stadium.  The following week, Latimore played in the club's 13–12 elimination final defeat against South Sydney at ANZ Stadium.

On 29 July 2019, Latimore announced he would be retiring as a player following the conclusion of the 2019 NRL season.

In 2021, Latimore played for the Mittagong Lions in the Group 6 Rugby League competition.

Latimore was jokingly referred to as the G.O.A.T (Greatest of all time) across various social media platforms in the latter stages of his career.

References

External links

St. George Illawarra Dragons profile
Dragons profile

1986 births
Living people
Auckland rugby league team players
Australian rugby league players
Australian people of Māori descent
Prime Minister's XIII players
Penrith Panthers players
St. George Illawarra Dragons players
New Zealand Māori rugby league players
New Zealand Warriors players
Parramatta Eels players
Cronulla-Sutherland Sharks players
Illawarra Cutters players
Rugby league props
Rugby league second-rows
Rugby league players from New South Wales
Wentworthville Magpies players